The 100th Jäger Division, formerly the 100th Light Infantry Division (German: 100. Leichte Infanterie Division) was a light infantry division of the German Army during World War II. As such, it was provided with partial horse or motor transport and lighter artillery. Light divisions were reduced in size compared to standard infantry divisions. The Walloon Legion was briefly attached to this division from January 1942 to May 1942. During the latter stages of the war, the division was composed of members from most of Germany's geographic areas and many German-speaking Walloons (Belgian/French).

Background

The main purpose of the German Jäger Divisions was to fight in adverse terrain where smaller, coordinated formations were more facilely combat capable than the brute force offered by their standard infantry counterparts. The Jäger divisions were more heavily equipped than the mountain Gebirgsjäger equivalents, but not as well armed as a larger infantry division. In the early stages of the war, it was the interface divisions fighting in rough terrain and foothills as well as urban areas, between the mountains and the plains. The Jägers (means "hunters" in German) relied on a high degree of training, and slightly superior communications, as well as their not inconsiderable artillery support.  In the middle stages of the war, as the standard infantry divisions were downsized, the Jäger structure of divisions with two infantry regiments, became the standard table of organization.

In 1944, Adolf Hitler declared that all infantry divisions were now Volksgrenadier Divisions except for his elite Jäger and Mountain Jäger divisions.

Operational history
Initially established in December 1940 as the 100th Light Infantry Division, the unit was raised in Upper Austria, and based in Ried. The 54th Jäger Regiment was detached from the 18th Infantry. The division comprised two-thirds Austrian and one-third Silesian men.

The 100th Light Infantry Division's first campaign as a fighting force was Operation Barbarossa, the invasion of the Soviet Union, where it served with the 17th Army in the Southern Sector. Its first campaign was in the Battle of Uman, followed by action at Kiev and Odessa.

In October, the 369th Reinforced Croatian Infantry Regiment was attached to the division to bolster its size when attacking the Eastern Front.

The formation was the only German Jäger Division that fought at the Battle of Stalingrad. The 100th Light Infantry Division, along with the 369th Reinforced Croatian Infantry Regiment, was virtually destroyed at Stalingrad.

The 100th Jäger Division was reestablished and fought partisans in the Balkans, Croatia, Albania, and was deployed on coastal protection duties in the Strait of Otranto.

Divisional order of battle
54th Jäger Regiment (moved from 18th Infantry Division)
227th Jäger Regiment
83rd Artillery Regiment
100th Reconnaissance Battalion
100th Panzerjäger Battalion
100th Engineer Battalion
100th Signal Battalion
100th Field Replacement Battalion
100th Divisional Supply Troops
369th (Croatian) Reinforced Infantry Regiment (attached from October 1941)

Commanding officers
Lieutenant General Werner Sanne (10 October 1940 – 31 January 1943)
Lieutenant General Willibald Utz (25 April 1943 – 1 January 1945)
Major General Otto Schury (1 February 1945 – May 1945)

References

Notes

Bibliography 
Hanns Neidhardt, Mit Tanne und Eichenlaub— Kriegschronik der 100. Jäger Division vormals 100. leichte Infanterie Division, Leopold Stocker Verlag Graz-Stuttgart, .

Military units and formations established in 1941
Jäger Divisions
German units at the Battle of Stalingrad
Military units and formations disestablished in 1945
Military units and formations of Germany in Yugoslavia in World War II